Alexandra Mueller and Asia Muhammad were the defending champions, having won the previous edition in 2011, but Mueller chose not to participate. Muhammad teamed up with Sanaz Marand as the second seeds, but they lost in the first round.

The top seeds Michaëlla Krajicek and Olivia Rogowska won the title, defeating Samantha Crawford and Sachia Vickery in the final, 7–6(7–4), 6–1.

Seeds

Draw

References 
 Draw

Usta Player Development Classic - Doubles